Daniel Oliver Davies (FRCGP) (15 October 1920 – 2 March 1977), also known as Dan Davies, was a British general practitioner who co-founded a health centre in Whitstable, established a general practitioner course in Canterbury, was secretary of the East Kent Division of the British Medical Association and served with the Zambia Flying Doctor Service. In 1945, while studying medicine at Guy's Hospital, he assisted at Bergen-Belsen concentration camp as a voluntary medical student.

The annual 'Dan Davies Competition' at the Whitstable Lifeboat Station is held in his memory.

See also
List of London medical students who assisted at Belsen

References 

20th-century British medical doctors
London medical students who assisted at Belsen
1945 in medicine
1977 deaths